Acanthodoris falklandica is a species of sea slug, a dorid nudibranch, a shell-less marine gastropod mollusc in the family Onchidorididae.

Distribution 
This species was described from Falkland Islands. It has been reported from Chile and a specimen from Puerto Montt, Llanquihue Province, has been sequenced for the Histone H3 gene.

References

Onchidorididae
Gastropods described in 1907